Eldridge Small (August 2, 1949 – May 11, 2015) was an American football cornerback who played with the National Football League's (NFL) New York Giants from 1972 to 1974.

Small was born in Houston, Texas, and attended Wheatley High School before playing college football for the Texas A&I Javelinas from 1968 to 1971 as a wide receiver and defensive back. As a receiver, he had 20 touchdowns in his college career, made 167 receptions, and had 2,547 receiving yards. Small was the Javelinas' all-time receptions leader until 2013, when Robert Armstrong surpassed his total. In 1971, Small was chosen as a member of the Little All-America team. Texas A&I won two National Association of Intercollegiate Athletics national championships during his time with the team. The university's Javelina Hall of Fame inducted Small in 1991.

In the 1972 NFL Draft, the Giants selected Small in the first round with the 17th overall pick, which they had obtained from the New England Patriots in a trade for defensive end Fred Dryer. He played in 34 games for the Giants over three seasons, intercepting one pass, in 1974, and amassing 353 kick return yards. In 1975, the Giants traded Small to the Cleveland Browns, but he was released before the start of the regular season. Following his NFL career, he began coaching in the Houston Independent School District, working for Sterling High School as an offensive coordinator. On May 11, 2015, when he was 65 years old, Small died.

References

External links
NFL.com profile

1949 births
2015 deaths
American football defensive backs
New York Giants players
Players of American football from Houston
Texas A&M–Kingsville Javelinas football players